James Radclyffe may refer to:
 James Radclyffe, 3rd Earl of Derwentwater, English Jacobite,
 James Bartholomew Radclyffe, 4th Earl of Newburgh, British nobleman